St. Alexander Nevsky Chapel is a historic Russian Orthodox church chapel in Akutan, Alaska, United States. Now is Diocese of Alaska of the Orthodox Church in America

It was built in 1918 as a replacement to an 1878 building, and used much of the same lumber.  It served the Russian Orthodox community in the trading port of Akutan.

It was added to the National Register of Historic Places in 1980.

See also
National Register of Historic Places listings in Aleutians East Borough, Alaska

References

External links

 

1918 establishments in Alaska
Churches completed in 1918
Historic American Buildings Survey in Alaska
Buildings and structures  on the National Register of Historic Places in Aleutians East Borough, Alaska
Churches on the National Register of Historic Places in Alaska
Russian Orthodox church buildings in Alaska
Russian Orthodox chapels